2-haloacid dehalogenase (configuration-inverting) (2-haloalkanoic acid dehalogenase, 2-haloalkanoid acid halidohydrolase, DL-2-haloacid dehalogenase, DL-2-haloacid dehalogenase (inversion of configuration), DL-2-haloacid halidohydrolase (inversion of configuration), DL-DEXi, (R,S)-2-haloacid dehalogenase (configuration-inverting)) is an enzyme with systematic name (S)-2-haloacid dehalogenase (configuration-inverting). This enzyme catalyses the following chemical reaction

 (1) (S)-2-haloacid + H2O  (R)-2-hydroxyacid + halide
 (2) (R)-2-haloacid + H2O  (S)-2-hydroxyacid + halide

This enzyme dehalogenates both (S)- and (R)-2-haloalkanoic acids.

References

External links 
 

EC 3.8.1